Raymond Colin Jones (14 February 1918 – July 1990) was an English road cyclist. He was born in Birmingham, England. He went to school in Wolverhampton and started racing in 1936, having two Olympic trials that year. In 1938, he came third in the road time trial at the British Empire Games. At the 1937 world championship he finished fifth, and 12th at the 1938 championship. In the same years he finished second in the Isle of Man time trial.

He joined the Royal Air Force in February 1940 and was demobilized in 1945. Jones is married to Betty and the couple have a son called Roy.

References

commonwealthgames.com results
"British Sport" by Hedley Trembath (1947)

1918 births
1990 deaths
English male cyclists
Cyclists at the 1938 British Empire Games
Commonwealth Games bronze medallists for England
Sportspeople from Birmingham, West Midlands
Commonwealth Games medallists in cycling
Medallists at the 1938 British Empire Games